In 2001, there were 1,073 members of The Church of Jesus Christ of Latter-day Saints (LDS Church) in Washington, D.C. It has since grown to 3,144 members in 4 congregations.

Official church membership as a percentage of general population was 0.38% in 2014. According to the 2014 Pew Forum on Religion & Public Life survey, roughly 1% of Washingtonians self-identify themselves most closely with The Church of Jesus Christ of Latter-day Saints.

History

In 1933, a large granite chapel was completed in the area.

Congregations
Congregations that meet in the District of Columbia

As of February 2023, the following congregations meet in the District of Columbia:
Capitol Hill Ward (English)
Eastern Market YSA Ward
Mount Pleasant Ward (Spanish)
Washington DC Branch (Sign Language)
Washington DC 3rd Ward (English)

Other congregations that serve the District of Columbia

Congregations meeting outside the District of Columbia that serve those in the District:
Chevy Chase Ward (English)
Falls Church 2nd Branch (Persian)
Friendship Heights YSA Ward
Montgomery Branch (Mandarin)
Potomac SA 1st Ward
Suitland Branch (Spanish)
Takoma Park Branch (French)

Temples

On November 19, 1974, the Washington D.C. Temple was dedicated by church president Spencer W. Kimball. Despite its name, the temple is not located within the District of Columbia; it is located in Kensington, Maryland, approximately three miles north of the city limits.

Meetinghouses

See also

 Washington DC LDS Stake

References

Further reading

 Based on an earlier, longer article which was later published as

External links
 Newsroom (District of Columbia)
 ComeUntoChrist.org Latter-day Saints Visitor site
 The Church of Jesus Christ of Latter-day Saints Official site

Christianity in Washington, D.C.
District of Columbia